Stéphane Debac (born 23 October 1973) is a French actor, best known for his acting debut as Jerome for South Korean Dogme 95 film Interview (2000), and played as 'Albert Mulveau' in the French TV series Résistance.

Career
He was born on 23 October 1973 in Lyon, France. Debac has appeared in several French films.

Filmography

References

1973 births
Living people
21st-century French male actors
French male film actors
French male television actors
French male stage actors